Security Divisions (German: Sicherungs-Divisionen) were German rear-area military units engaged in Nazi security warfare in occupied Europe during World War II. Almost all divisions were employed in areas on the Eastern front with the exception of the 325th Security Division which operated within Occupied France. The units were tasked with fighting local partisans, intelligience and counter-insurgency against resistance groups, rounding up Jews and other ethnic groups as part of The Holocaust, and conducting punitive actions in civilian areas. 

These divisions carried out numerous war crimes. Many of their commanders were punished after the war at the Subsequent Nuremberg trials for their conduct during the war.

History

The Wehrmacht security divisions were set up at the beginning of 1941 and were intended to perform policing, security and counter-insurgency duties in the rear of the main German field armies, under the direction of the respective army rear area command, or Korück. They were organised from divisions initially raised in the 3rd wave of mobilisation, these being former Landwehr divisions largely manned by second-line reservists.

As Rear Security Divisions they were not well equipped like front line troops, some of the divisions started out as infantry divisions but once they were assigned to rear security, their heavy weapons were sent off to be used by front line troops.

Many of the Security Divisions were thrown into frontline service during the major Soviet offensives of 1944, such as Operation Bagration, and destroyed in the process. Some were rebuilt as standard infantry divisions due to the chronic manpower shortages of the Wehrmacht in this period.

Organization
Security divisions were often made up of soldiers from the reserve and in 1942 Landeschützen (territorial guard) troops. Police battalions were also part of the divisions, which were supposed to be provided with one standard regiment of troops, plus an artillery detachment, as a 'strike force', though in practice this was often used for frontline duty as local conditions demanded. In many cases, the Security Divisions also included battalions of Ukrainian, Russian or French soldiers as well as a unit of captured foreign tanks. Their exact organisation varied widely between individual formations and during the course of the war (see the 286th Security Division for example).

52nd Security Division
201st Security Division
203rd Security Division
207th Security Division
213th Security Division
221st Security Division
281st Security Division
285th Security Division
286th Security Division
325th Security Division
390th Security Division
391st Security Division
403rd Security Division
444th Security Division
454th Security Division
707th Infantry Division

Almost all the Security Divisions operated on the Eastern front, with the exception of the 325th which operated in Occupied France.

Wehrmacht war crimes

The Security Divisions of the Wehrmacht were responsible for a large number of war crimes and in many cases for systematic programmes of repression against the civilian population. This occurred most notably on the Eastern Front, particularly in the rear areas of Army Group Centre, where they acted with extreme brutality. The British historian Ian Kershaw concludes that the Wehrmacht'''s duty was to ensure that the people who met Hitler's requirements of being part of the Aryan Herrenvolk ("Aryan master race") had living space. He wrote that:

Several high-ranking Wehrmacht officers, including Hermann Hoth, Georg von Küchler, Georg-Hans Reinhardt, Karl von Roques, Walter Warlimont and others, were convicted of war crimes and crimes against humanity at the High Command Trial given sentences ranging from time served to life. During World War II, the German military helped fulfill Nazism's racial, political, and territorial ambitions. Long after the war, a myth persisted claiming the German military (or Wehrmacht) was not involved in the Holocaust and other crimes associated with Nazi genocidal policy. This belief is untrue. The German military participated in many aspects of the Holocaust: in supporting Hitler, in the use of forced labor, and in the mass murder of Jews and other groups targeted by the Nazis.

The military’s complicity extended not only to the generals and upper leadership but also to the rank and file. In addition, the war and genocidal policy were inextricably linked. The German army (or Heer) was the most complicit as a result of being on the ground in Germany’s eastern campaigns, but all branches participated.

References

Bibliography
 Bartov, Omer. Hitler's Army: Soldiers, Nazis, and War in the Third Reich, OUP, 1992. 
 Gerlach, Christian. Kalkulierte Morde, 2000. 
 Shepherd, Ben. War in the Wild East: The German Army and Soviet Partisans'', Harvard University Press, 2004. 

Security divisions of Germany during World War II